Maze: Secret Love is a 2015 South Korean-Japanese eroticism/thriller film.

Cast

 Akiho Yoshizawa (吉沢明歩) as Ayaka (아야카)
 Aino Kishi (希志あいの) as Shiori (시오리)
 Kim Min-gi (김민기) as Min-joon (민준)
 Lee Kyoo-bok (이규복)
 Hwang Ji-hoo (황지후)

References

External links
 

2015 films
2010s Korean-language films
2010s Japanese-language films
South Korean erotic thriller films
Japanese erotic thriller films
2010s Japanese films
2010s South Korean films